The 1931–32 FA Cup was the 57th season of the world's oldest football cup competition, the Football Association Challenge Cup, commonly known as the FA Cup. Newcastle United won the competition for the third time, beating Arsenal 2–1 in the final at Wembley.

Matches were scheduled to be played at the stadium of the team named first on the date specified for each round, which was always a Saturday. Some matches, however, might be rescheduled for other days if there were clashes with games for other competitions or the weather was inclement. If scores were level after 90 minutes had been played, a replay would take place at the stadium of the second-named team later the same week. If the replayed match was drawn further replays would be held until a winner was determined. If scores were level after 90 minutes had been played in a replay, a 30-minute period of extra time would be played.

Calendar

First round proper
At this stage 42 clubs from the Football League Third Division North and South joined the 25 non-league clubs having come through the qualifying rounds. Southport and Exeter City were given a bye to the Third Round. To make the number of matches up, non-league Aldershot Town were given byes to this round. Bath City were also given a bye to the First Round, awarded during the Fourth Qualifying Round, and not as a result of the normal process of the FA Cup. Also notable in this round is the home win awarded to Burton Town, probably given as a result of Wigan Borough folding that year and resigning from the Football League. 34 matches were scheduled to be played on Saturday, 28 November 1931. Eight were drawn and went to replays in the following midweek fixture, of which one went to two more replays.

Second round proper
The matches were played on Saturday, 12 December 1931. Three matches were drawn, with replays taking place in the following midweek fixture.

Third round proper
The 44 First and Second Division clubs entered the competition at this stage, along with Third Division Southport and Exeter City. Also entered at this stage, to make up the numbers, were Corinthian, who were a famous amateur side. The matches were scheduled for Saturday, 9 January 1932. Twelve matches were drawn and went to replays in the following midweek fixture.

Fourth round proper
The matches were scheduled for Saturday, 23 January 1932. Three games were drawn and went to replays in the following midweek fixture, of which two went to second replays.

Fifth round proper
The matches were scheduled for Saturday, 13 February 1932. There was one replay, between Chelsea and Sheffield Wednesday, played in the next midweek fixture.

Sixth round proper
The four Sixth Round ties were scheduled to be played on Saturday, 27 February 1932. There were no replays.

Semi-finals
The semi-final matches were played on Saturday, 12 March 1932. Newcastle United and Arsenal won their matches to meet in the final at Wembley.

Final

The 1932 FA Cup Final was contested by Newcastle United and Arsenal at Wembley in what became known as the "Over The Line" final. Newcastle won 2–1, both of their goals scored by Jack Allen.

Match details

See also
FA Cup Final Results 1872-

References
General
Official site; fixtures and results service at TheFA.com
1931-32 FA Cup at rssf.com
1931-32 FA Cup at soccerbase.com

Specific

FA Cup seasons
FA
Cup